Dennis Trott (born 20 July 1955) is a Bermudian sprinter. He competed in the men's 100 metres at the 1976 Summer Olympics.

References

1955 births
Living people
Athletes (track and field) at the 1976 Summer Olympics
Bermudian male sprinters
Bermudian long jumpers
Olympic athletes of Bermuda
Athletes (track and field) at the 1975 Pan American Games
Athletes (track and field) at the 1978 Commonwealth Games
Athletes (track and field) at the 1979 Pan American Games
Commonwealth Games competitors for Bermuda
Place of birth missing (living people)
Pan American Games competitors for Bermuda